Midnight blue is a dark shade of blue named for its resemblance to the apparently blue color of a moonlit night sky around a full moon. Midnight blue is identifiably blue to the eye in sunlight or full-spectrum light, but can appear black under certain more limited spectra sometimes found in artificial lighting (especially early 20th-century incandescent). It is similar to navy, which is also a dark blue.

Variations

X11 

There are two major shades of midnight blue—the X11 color and the Crayola color. This color was originally called midnight. The first recorded use of midnight as a color name in English was in 1915.

At right is displayed the color midnight blue. This is the X11 web color midnight blue.

Dark midnight blue (Crayola)

At right is displayed the dark shade of midnight blue that is called midnight blue in Crayola crayons. Midnight blue became an official crayola color in 1958; before that, since having been formulated by Crayola in 1903, it was called Prussian blue.

In culture

Higher education 
 Hatfield College, part of Durham University, uses midnight blue as its associated color

Fashion 
 Midnight blue is an alternative to black as a color for dinner jackets. Due to the deepness of the color, midnight blue formal clothes are often almost indistinguishable from black. The Duke of Windsor popularized the color in suits and tuxedos.

Military 
 The dark blue of US Army and US Marine Corps dress blue uniform coats is called midnight blue.
 The Special Reconnaissance Regiment uses midnight blue on its stable belts, as a flat color all round.

Sports 
 The Denver Nuggets of the National Basketball Association use midnight blue and sunshine yellow as their official team colors.
 The University of Toledo Rockets use midnight blue and gold as their official team colors.
 The Edmonton Oilers of the National Hockey League used midnight blue as an official team color from 1996 to 2012.

Music 
 In 1963, American jazz guitarist Kenny Burrell released the album Midnight Blue.
 In 1975, Melissa Manchester released "Midnight Blue".
 In 1979, the album, Discovery, released by British symphonic rock turned disco band Electric Light Orchestra, contained a song named "Midnight Blue."
 In 1987, rock vocalist Lou Gramm released a single entitled "Midnight Blue".

See also
 List of colors

References

Shades of black
Shades of blue